Fehérvári or Fehervari is a surname. Notable people with the surname include: 

Alfréd Fehérvári (1925-2007), Hungarian football player
Gábor Fehérvári (born 1990), Hungarian singer, known as Freddie
Gabriel Fehervari (born 1960), Belgian businessman
Vince Fehérvári, Australian sprint canoeist